Jankowo  is a village in the administrative district of Gmina Rychliki, within Elbląg County and Warmian-Masurian Voivodeship, in northern Poland.

References

villages in Elbląg County